Dmitri Aleksandrovich Kabanov (born 12 December 1985) is a former Russian professional football player.

Club career
He made his debut for FC Luch-Energiya Vladivostok on 2 July 2006 in the Russian Cup game against FC Dynamo Makhachkala.

External links
 

1985 births
Living people
Russian footballers
Association football defenders
FC Luch Vladivostok players
FC Okean Nakhodka players
FC Amur Blagoveshchensk players